David Cecil may refer to:

 David Cecil (courtier) (c. 1460–?1540), MP for Stamford 1504–1523
 David Cecil, 3rd Earl of Exeter (c. 1600–1643), 17th Century British MP and peer
 Lord David Cecil (1902–1986), British biographer,  literary scholar and academic
 David Cecil, 6th Marquess of Exeter (1905–1981), British athlete, sports official and Conservative politician
 David Cecil (producer), British theatre producer